Chance is a 1984 science fiction comedy film directed by Aleksandr Mayorov based on the short story The Martian Potion from the cycle The Great Guslyar by Kir Bulychov.

Plot
In the middle of the 17th century, a Cossack named Almaz Bitiy saves an alien from a certain death. In gratitude, he gives the Earthman an elixir of youth. By constantly using the elixir, Almaz and his girlfriend Milica live until the 20th century. The time has come to regain youth, and Almaz returns to the city of Great Guslyar, where the secret means is kept. However, the mystery is revealed, and several residents of the city have the opportunity to experience the action of the "Martian Potion".

Second youth gives new strength to life to some, while others get nothing but problems and troubles. In the finale, the alien leaves a second chance to live anew only for those who really want and deserve it.

Cast
Sergey Plotnikov — Almaz Bitiy
Igor Shkurin — Almaz Bitiy (young)
Maria Kapnist — Milica Fyodorovna
Dilorom Kambarova — Milica Fyodorovna (young)
Raisa Kurkina — Elena Sergeevna
Veronika Izotova — Elena Sergeevna (young)
Viktor Pavlov — Cornelius Ivanovich Udalov
Sasha Evteev — Cornelius Udalov (young)
Lyudmila Ivanova — Ksenia Udalova
Maya Menglet — Vanda Savic
Elena Tonunts — Vanda Savich (young)
Boris Ivanov — Nikita Savich
Andrei Zaretsky — Nikita Savich (young)
Igor Yasulovich — Alexander Grubin
Sergey Zhigunov — Alexander Grubin (young)
Vera Novikova — Shurochka
Andrey Nikolaev — Metelkin
Vadim Aleksandrov — The Stranger

References

External links

Mosfilm films
1980s science fiction comedy films
Russian science fiction comedy films
Soviet science fiction comedy films
Films based on works by Kir Bulychov
1984 comedy films
1984 films
1980s Russian-language films